Steeton may refer to:

 Steeton, North Yorkshire, a civil parish of North Yorkshire
 Steeton, West Yorkshire, a village within the civil parish of Steeton with Eastburn
 Steeton and Silsden railway station, serving Steeton, West Yorkshire
 Steeton with Eastburn, a civil parish of West Yorkshire, England